Dave Solomon (31 May 1913 – 15 August 1997) was a Fijian-born rugby football player who represented New Zealand in both rugby union (as a five-eighth and fullback) and rugby league. His brother Frank Solomon was also an All Black.

Early years
Solomon attended Mt Albert Grammar, and was in the 1st XV in 1931.

Rugby union career

Playing with the Ponsonby rugby union club, Solomon moved south; playing for the Matamata sub-union 1932–43 and represented the Waikato Rugby Union in 1934 before moving back home and playing for Auckland 1935–38, in every back position except wing. He made the 1935 All Blacks tour and travelled with the squad to Great Britain, playing in eight tour matches in 1934–35 and scored 3 points (a try) for New Zealand.

Rugby league career
In 1939 Solomon switched codes to play rugby league. He was named in the 1939–40 New Zealand national rugby league team squad, however the tour was cut short by World War II.

Return to rugby union
After the war he returned to rugby union, and coached the East Coast Bays and Northcote clubs on the North Shore.

Later years
Solomon became a Samoan Matai. He died in Auckland on 15 August 1997.

References

1997 deaths
New Zealand rugby league players
New Zealand national rugby league team players
1913 births
New Zealand people of Fijian descent
New Zealand sportspeople of Samoan descent
Auckland rugby league team players
New Zealand rugby union players
New Zealand rugby union coaches
Auckland rugby union players
New Zealand international rugby union players
Rugby league five-eighths
Rugby union fullbacks
Rugby union fly-halves
Samoan chiefs
People educated at Mount Albert Grammar School
Dual-code rugby internationals
People from Levuka
Fijian people of Samoan descent
Samoan people of Fijian descent
Fijian emigrants to New Zealand